The River Lowther is a small river which flows through limestone rock in Cumbria, England. It is a tributary of the River Eamont which in turn is a tributary of the River Eden which flows into the Solway Firth near Carlisle. The Lowther begins with the confluence of the Keld Gill and the Keld Dub near the village of Keld. It flows north-west until it passes between Bampton and Bampton Grange, before turning north until it flows into the River Eamont close to Penrith.

It is the main spawning area for Eden spring salmon, but is primarily a trout fishery. The river is held back by the Wet Sleddale dam, and so flows at a fairly consistent level (between 0.33 m and 1.8 m for 90% of monitoring time), with the highest level ever recorded at the River Lowther (2.93 m) occurring at Eamont Bridge, Beehive, on Sunday 6 December 2015.

Its name is recorded about 1175 as Lauder. It may come from Brittonic lǭwadr, "a washing or bathing place", which would give it the same etymology as Lauder, Scotland. Alternatively, it may come from Old Norse lauðr + á, meaning "foamy river".

Settlements

Keld
Rosgill
Bampton Grange
Bampton
Askham
Lowther
Eamont Bridge
Brougham

Sights and attractions

Keld Chapel (National Trust), Keld
Shap Abbey, (English Heritage), near Shap
Askham Hall, Askham
Lowther Castle
Castlesteads Ruins, Yarnwath Woods
King Arthur's Round Table Henge, Eamont Bridge
Mayburgh Henge, Eamont Bridge
Brougham Hall
Brocavum Roman Camp
Brougham Castle (English Heritage)

Tributaries
Swindale Beck
Haweswater Beck
Gill Beck
Heltondale Beck

Gallery

References

Lowther, River
2Lowther